This is a list of members of the South Australian House of Assembly from 1968 to 1970, as elected at the 1968 state election:

 The narrow re-election of the Labor member for Millicent, Des Corcoran, was overturned by the Court of Disputed Returns on 28 May 1968. Corcoran won the resulting by-election on 22 June 1968.

Members of South Australian parliaments by term
20th-century Australian politicians